John Nicolas Borotsik (November 26, 1949 – June 8, 2018) was a Canadian ice hockey centre. He is credited with playing in one NHL game for the St. Louis Blues.

See also
List of players who played only one game in the NHL

References

External links

1949 births
2018 deaths
Brandon Wheat Kings players
Canadian ice hockey centres
Ice hockey people from Manitoba
Sportspeople from Brandon, Manitoba
St. Louis Blues players
Undrafted National Hockey League players